Romanu Tikotikoca is a Fijian police officer, who was named on 7 December 2006  as Commissioner of Police by the Republic of Fiji Military Forces, who had seized power on 5 December. Tikotikoca was chosen to replace Andrew Hughes, with whom the Military had fallen out before the coup.  Before Tikotikoca could take up his duties, Jimi Koroi was appointed Acting Commissioner in a temporary capacity.

Tikotikoca joined the police force in 1968. Senior positions held by Tikotikoca include Divisional Police Commander, Head of Special Branch unit, and Assistant Police Commissioner, Crime.  Most recently, he participated in peacekeeping duties under the RAMSI operation in the Solomon Islands in 2005, before becoming head of security at Goldridge Mining Limited in the Solomons in December that year.

On 16 January 2007, Tikotikoca told Radio New Zealand that the people of Fiji must accept that the Military held the upper hand in defining the law. 

Tikotikoca returned to Fiji on 31 January 2007, and was expected to take up his duties soon. This did not, however, eventuate.

Tikotikoca hails from the island of Taveuni, in Cakaudrove Province.

References

People from Taveuni
Fijian police chiefs
Living people
Year of birth missing (living people)